"Whole World Is Watching" is a song by Dutch symphonic metal and rock band Within Temptation from their sixth studio album, Hydra. It was released in Poland as the third single from the album on 22 January 2014 and was scheduled to have its main release on 21 February. The song features guest vocals from Dave Pirner of Soul Asylum, with Polish rock singer Piotr Rogucki of the band Coma providing vocals on the Polish version of Hydra.

The song premiered on Polish national radio on 10 January 2014, and received its first airplay in the Netherlands and Belgium on 15 January 2014. In the United Kingdom, the song had its first airplay on BBC Radio 2 on June 6 during The Ken Bruce Show.

Background
According to music critics and lead vocalist Sharon den Adel, the song is the slowest one on Hydra. Before the song was finished, the band was already considering inviting Dave Pirner to provide his vocals on the track by its "captivating" voice, turning the final result as the band thought that it should be. The song premiered on the Polish national radio station Polskie Radio Program III. The Polish version of the song features the native singer Piotr Rogucki instead of Pirner. A few days later, on 15 January 2014, the main version of the song, featuring Pirner, was released as a promotional song on Dutch and Belgian radio station Q-music. According to the band's official Facebook account, a video for the song was shot on 20 November 2013. A teaser trailer for the video was released on 24 January 2014 and the video was released on 31 January 2014, the same day of the Hydra release.

Sharon den Adel's explanation of the song's lyrics;

Live performances
During the Hydra World Tour, the song was frequently performed by the band in an acoustic rendition and only with den Adel's vocals. The band also performed the song on several occasions, such as TV performances and special events, and with different renditions. On 5 February 2014, an acoustic version was present at Dutch TV program De Wereld Draait Door. On 25 February 2014, the full electric version was played at Dutch TV program RTL Late Night. On 5 April 2014, the band performed the electric version of the song alongside Piotr Rogucki at the finals of the World Boxing Association in Rostock. Rogucki also joined the band at the 2015 Pol'and'Rock Festival to perform a special duet in the acoustic rendition of the song. On 27 March 2022, the band performed the song online when taking part in an international series of performances from several artists in support of Ukraine during the Russo-Ukrainian War, which was broadcast in more than 20 countries and featured more than 50 musical artists.

Track listing

Charts

References

2014 singles
2014 songs
Within Temptation songs
Heavy metal ballads
Songs written by Sharon den Adel
Songs written by Robert Westerholt
Nuclear Blast Records singles
Male–female vocal duets